Jeff Chan is an American film director and screenwriter. He was born in Ridgewood, New Jersey.

Chan's work has included directing the films Find Makarov: Operation Kingfish, Code 8, Plus One, and Code 8: Part II. 

Chan has also worked as a screenwriter for television. He was nominated at the 72nd Writers Guild of America Awards in 2019 among the writers of comedy series PEN15.

References

 American film directors
 American screenwriters
 Living people
 Year of birth missing (living people)
 People from Ridgewood, New Jersey